Afroedura pongola, also known as the Pongola rock gecko, is a species of African geckos, first found in the Limpopo and Mpumalanga provinces of South Africa.

References

External links
Reptile database entry

Afroedura
Reptiles described in 2014
Endemic reptiles of South Africa